The 1898 Greensburg Athletic Association season was their ninth season in existence. The team finished 6–2–1.

Schedule

Game notes

References

Greensburg Athletic Association
Greensburg Athletic Association seasons
Greensburg Athletic Association